Sarah Wigglesworth MBE RDI is a British award-winning architect and was a Professor of Architecture at the University of Sheffield until 2016.

Career
Wigglesworth founded Sarah Wigglesworth Architects in 1994. Her practice has a reputation for sustainable architecture and an interest in using alternative, low energy materials. One of the practice's best known buildings is the Straw Bale House in Islington, London. The building was designed as a house for Wigglesworth and her partner Jeremy Till, and an office occupied by Sarah Wigglesworth Architects, using straw bales, cement-filled sandbags, silicon-faced fibreglass cloth and gabions filled with recycled concrete. ‘This doesn’t look like a traditional green building,’ said Wigglesworth. ‘We want to bring green architecture into the mainstream by making it more urban and urbane.” The house featured in the first series of Grand Designs on Channel 4 in 1999, widely exhibited including Benaki Museum (AAO Lina Stergiou), and published.

She was Professor of Architecture at the University of Sheffield from 1999 to 2016 where she founded the PhD BY Design in 2002. Her academic work often blended with her ‘live’ projects and she describes her research focus as ‘revealing the workings of practice. She led DWELL (Designing for Wellbeing in Environments for Later Life) – a research project at the University of Sheffield into the design of houses and neighbourhoods for older people.

Early in her career in 1991 Wigglesworth, together with Till, was the first architect to be awarded the Fulbright Arts Fellowship. Wigglesworth was appointed MBE in 2004 and in 2012 became the first woman to receive the prestigious Royal Designer for Industry award for architecture.

Alongside the Straw Bale House, Wigglesworth’s Sandal Magna School in Wakefield has been described as an exemplar of passive, sustainable design. Wigglesworth also places an emphasis on building users’ involvement in design and buildings. The recent Mellor Primary School incorporates spaces for natural habitats and is designed to aid the school's curriculum and help pupils interact with the building.

Sarah Wigglesworth is an outspoken advocate of the role of women in architecture. In 1995 she was an initiator of Desiring Practices: Architecture, Gender and the Interdisciplinary, an exhibition, symposium, catalogue and book that explored gender differences in architectural practice. She continues to criticise the architectural profession for failing to support women properly as architecture students or practitioners.

Notable works
 Straw Bale House and office, London (2001) – RIBA Award and RIBA Sustainability Prize
 Classroom of the Future, Sheffield (2005) – RIBA Award
 Siobhan Davies Dance Studios, London (2006) – RIBA Award
 Cremorne Riverside Centre, London (2008) – RIBA Award
 Heathfield Children's Centre, London (2008)
 Sandal Magna Community Primary School, Wakefield (2010) - RIBA Award
 Mellor Primary School, Stockport (2015) – RIBA Award
 Deborah House Artist Studios (2015)

Personal life
Wigglesworth grew up in north London, attending Camden School for Girls. She studied architecture at the University of Cambridge from 1976 to 1983, graduating with distinction.

Her long-term partner Jeremy Till is Head of Central Saint Martins and Pro Vice Chancellor of the University of the Arts London.

Wigglesworth's father was Gordon Wigglesworth, an eminent public authority architect in London. He “....was a distinguished member of that group which oversaw the huge postwar public building programmes. The director of building development at the Ministry of Public Buildings and Works (MPBW) from 1967 to 1972, he went on to become the principal architect for education at the Inner London Education Authority from 1972 to 1974. He was then housing architect to the Greater London Council until 1980. Within all these large establishments Gordon created environments where architecture could happen.  Under his direction, GLC housing architects were responsible for the continuation of one of last century's great housebuilding achievements. He was also instrumental in disseminating GLC research through a series of influential books and pamphlets”. Extract from his obituary in The Guardian  “Gordon Wigglesworth:  Key architect in postwar urban regeneration“ by Alan Turner, published Friday 19 August 2005.

References

External links
 Sarah Wigglesworth Architects
 Sheffield University profile
Lerner, Kevin. “Sarah Wigglesworth Architects.” Architectural Record 190, no. 1 (January 1, 2002): 43–44. https://search.ebscohost.com/login.aspx?direct=true&db=bvh&AN=445676&site=ehost-live.
“Primary School in Takeley: Sarah Wigglesworth Architects, London.” Detail (English Ed.), no. 3 (May 1, 2013): 264–65. https://search.ebscohost.com/login.aspx?direct=true&db=bvh&AN=695792&site=ehost-live.
Rüedi, Katerina., Sarah Wigglesworth, and Duncan McCorquodale. Desiring Practices: Architecture, Gender, and the Interdisciplinary. London: Black Dog Pub., 1996.

Living people
British women architects
21st-century British architects
British women academics
Academics of the University of Sheffield
Members of the Order of the British Empire
Year of birth missing (living people)